Neostatherotis pallidtornus is a moth of the family Tortricidae. It is found in Vietnam.

Average wingspan is 20 mm. The ground colour of the forewings is cream, slightly suffused with brownish ochreous especially along the costa and dorsum. The dorsal third of the wing is densely strigulated (finely streaked) with grey brown. The hindwings are brownish grey.

Etymology
The name refers to colouration of tornal area of the forewing and is derived from Latin pallidus (meaning pale).

References

Moths described in 2008
Olethreutini
Moths of Asia
Taxa named by Józef Razowski